Eritrea participated at the 2018 Summer Youth Olympics in Buenos Aires, Argentina from 6 October to 18 October 2018.

Medalists

Competitors

Athletics

Boys

Girls

Cycling

Eritrea was given a boys' and girls' combined team to competed by the tripartite committee.

 Boys' combined team - 1 team of 2 athletes
 Girls' combined team - 1 team of 2 athletes

Combined team

References

2018 in Eritrean sport
Nations at the 2018 Summer Youth Olympics
Eritrea at the Youth Olympics